Felix Patrick Quinn (2 November 1874 – 28 March 1961) was a Canadian industrialist and parliamentarian.

A Conservative, he served three terms in the House of Commons of Canada as a Member of Parliament representing the Nova Scotia electoral district of Halifax.

He was first elected in the Canadian federal election of 1925 and was re-elected in 1926 and 1930.

Quinn was appointed to the Senate of Canada on 20 July 1935 on the recommendation of R.B. Bennett. He represented the senatorial division of Bedford-Halifax until his death at the age of 86.

Electoral record

External links
 

1874 births
1961 deaths
Canadian senators from Nova Scotia
Canadian people of Irish descent
Conservative Party of Canada (1867–1942) MPs
Conservative Party of Canada (1867–1942) senators
Members of the House of Commons of Canada from Nova Scotia
People from Halifax, Nova Scotia